Kabirhat is an upazila of the Noakhali District, located in Bangladesh's Chittagong Division. It is named after its administrative centre, the town of Kabirhat, and is the newest upazila of the district.

History

It is said that the independent Sultan Fakhruddin Mubarak Shah, the first Muslim to conquer Chittagong, was born in Kabirhat. Under the Mughal Empire in circa 1770, Sheikh Nurullah Chaudhuri and Sheikh Mujirullah Chaudhuri established the three-domed Ramadan Miah Mosque. The antique mosque is located in the village of Dawlat Ramdi in Bataiya Union. The Hoiya Miah Mosque is also a notable three-domed mosque in the area. The Sufi dervish Chhankhola was active in Kabirhat and he was buried in a mazar (mausoleum) in Narottampur. The Kabirhat Madrasa was established in 1905.

In circa 1895, a prominent businessman of Ward 2 by the name of Kabir Patwari opened a shop near his house yard. He later extended his shop further north to meet the needs of the people of the area. A haat bazaar was eventually established and every Friday and Tuesday, the people of the area start coming there for their daily necessities. In this way, the market came to be known as Kabir-Hat. Kabir Patwary Jami Mosque in Ghoshbagh is a notable mosque in the area too.

The 1970 Bhola cyclone heavily affected Kabirhat in every sector. During the Bangladesh Liberation War of 1971, the local Razakars established a camp at the Kabirhat High School. The school was used a slaughter place and a ditch was dug on the eastern part of the high school. The Pakistan Army and the Razakars plundered Company Hat and set fire to houses in the village of Alipur in Ghoshbagh on 27 September. On 17 October, the Bengali freedom fighters raided Razakar Jalil's house, killing him and his associates.

Kabirhat suffered from another cyclone in 1991. On 6 August 2006, the Kabirhat Upazila (sub-district) was formed from some unions of Noakhali Sadar Upazila.

Geography
It borders Begumganj and Senbagh upazilas to the north, Companiganj Upazila to the east and south, and Noakhali Sadar Upazila to the west. The Noakhali Canal flows north through the upazila.

Demographics

According to the 2011 Bangladesh census, Kabirhat Upazila had 36,054 households and a population of 196,944, 8.8% of whom lived in urban areas. 12.4% of the population was under age 5. The literacy rate (age 7 and over) was 49.0%, compared to the national average of 51.8%.

Administration
Kabirhat Upazila is divided into Kabirhat Municipality and seven union parishads: Batiaya, Chap Rashirhat, Dhan Shalik, Dhan Siri, Ghoshbagh, Narottampur, and Sundalpur. The union parishads are subdivided into 68 mauzas and 68 villages.

Kabirhat Municipality is subdivided into 9 wards and 11 mahallas.

Education

Kabirhat Government College and Chaprashir Hat College are there. Chaprashirhat high school is the pioneer school in Kabirhat and was rewarded by Upazila and District Education office.

Fazil Madrasha is one of the oldest Madrassas of the country. It was formally established in 1901, but began operating after 1880.

Notable people
Abdus Shakur, litterateur
Fakhruddin Mubarak Shah, independent Sultan of Sonargaon
Rumman Bin Wali Sabbir, footballer

See also
Upazilas of Bangladesh
Districts of Bangladesh
Divisions of Bangladesh

References

Kabirhat Upazila